Eudioctria media is a species of robber flies in the family Asilidae.

References

Further reading

External links

 
 

Asilidae
Articles created by Qbugbot
Insects described in 1917